Charles Hamilton, Lord Binning (1697 – 27 December 1732), was a Scottish nobleman, politician and poet.

Life

The son of Thomas Hamilton, 6th Earl of Haddington, and Helen Hope, he used the courtesy title Lord Binning from birth.

Lord Binning was present with his father at the Battle of Sheriffmuir, in 1715. From 1718 until his death he held office as Knight Marischal, an office that had been vacant since the battle following the forfeiture of the Jacobite, Earl of Kintore.

He was elected at the 1722 general election as a member of parliament (MP) for borough of St Germans in Cornwall, and held the seat until the 1727 general election.

Lord Binning had an important influence on the decision of his father-in-law, George Baillie of Jerviswood, to build Mellerstain House, and he took an active interest in the design of its policies.

In 1731, and in increasingly frail health, Lord Binning, accompanied by the Baillie family, left Britain for the continent, and settled in Naples, where he died on 27 December 1732.

Marriage and issue
On 3 September 1717, he married Rachel Baillie, the daughter of George Baillie of Jerviswood and Mellerstain and Lady Grisell Baillie. His wife outlived Binning for 41 years, dying at Mellerstain in 1773.

Thomas Hamilton, 7th Earl of Haddington.
George Baillie-Hamilton, grandfather to George Baillie-Hamilton, 10th Earl of Haddington
Grizel Hamilton, married Philip Stanhope, 2nd Earl Stanhope

References

Notes

Sources
 Anderson, J., Historical and genealogical memoirs of the House of Hamilton; with genealogical memoirs of the several branches of the family, Edinburgh 1825.
 Balfour Paul, Sir J., Scots Peerage IX vols. Edinburgh 1904.

1697 births
1732 deaths
Scottish politicians
Heirs apparent who never acceded
Members of the Parliament of Great Britain for constituencies in Cornwall
British MPs 1722–1727
British courtesy barons and lords of Parliament